ArieForce One is an upcoming steel roller coaster being built at Fun Spot America Atlanta in Fayetteville, Georgia. The project was first announced by representatives of the Fun Spot America chain in May 2021, and the coaster was formally unveiled at the IAAPA Orlando Expo on November 16, 2021. At a cost of $13 million, ArieForce One will represent the single largest investment on any ride in Fun Spot America's history. ArieForce One is currently expected to debut on March 31st, 2023.

History

On May 25, 2021, Fun Spot America Atlanta announced that they had partnered with Idaho-based Rocky Mountain Construction (otherwise known as RMC) to construct a major new steel coaster for the 2022 season. Management also pursued a naming rights deal with one of Atlanta's major sports franchises. In June 2021, park representatives held negotiations with either the Atlanta Hawks or Atlanta Dream professional basketball team executives at their corporate office. On June 11, 2021, Fun Spot America Theme Parks officially trademarked the name "Arie Force One", sparking rumors that the sponsorship attempts had fallen through.

Throughout the summer, Fun Spot socials systematically released conceptual renderings of the coaster. ArieForce One was officially unveiled on November 16, 2021, at the IAAPA Expo in Orlando, Florida. The coaster train's lead car was also unveiled and put on display that day at RMC's event booth.

On January 6, 2022, Fun Spot America Atlanta hosted a groundbreaking ceremony for the coaster.

Ride experience
Riders will rise up into the coaster's first inversion, a dive loop (dubbed as a Raven Truss Dive) acting as a turnaround. A speed hill directly proceeding such will lead up into the second inversion, a large Zero-G stall underneath the lift hill, followed by a large outwards-banked airtime hill, which redirects the train 90° to the left and into the park. After speeding through a double up, a sharp drop leads into the third inversion, a tight barrel roll overtop of the park's arcade building. Behind the park's main buildings, the track will proceed through an off-axis hill, right-hand turnaround, and a final Zero-g roll. A second low hill above the arcade will lead riders into the coaster's final stretch; a quad-down prior to popping up into the final brake run, the station of which follows after a 90° turn to the right. One ride on ArieForce One is advertised to last 100 seconds.

Characteristics
The natural topography results in a total elevation change of  throughout the ride layout. The coaster will run two 5-car trains, each car of which seats riders in two rows of two, resulting in an occupancy of 20 passengers per train and an estimated hourly capacity of 900 people per hour. ArieForce One will contain an 83° first drop and four inversions, including a headlining "Raven Truss Dive" and the largest Zero-G stall in the United States. G-forces throughout the ride will vary, with riders being subjected to vertical G-forces between 3.75 g and -1.0 g, as well as lateral forces of +/- 1.25 g.

References

External links

 

Hybrid roller coasters
Roller coasters in Georgia (U.S. state)
Roller coasters planned to open in 2023